Oatley, an electoral district of the Legislative Assembly in the Australian state of New South Wales, has had two incarnations, the first from 1927 to 1930, the second from 2007 to the present.


Members for Oatley

Election results

Elections in the 2010s

2019

2015

2011

Elections in the 2000s

2007

1930 - 2007

Elections in the 1920s

1927

References

New South Wales state electoral results by district